Tu Tsung-ming, was the first Doctor of Medical Sciences (equivalent to Ph.D.) of Taiwan. He was born in Tamsui in 1893, trained as a physician at Taiwan Governor's Medical School, and received his doctorate degree from Kyoto Imperial University (now Kyoto University) in 1922. He became the first Taiwanese professor in Japan's pre-1945 imperial university system, at Taihoku Imperial University (now National Taiwan University). His pharmacology research lab was the cradle of medical research in Taiwan. The laboratory did pioneering research on methods to treat opium addiction, on the toxicology of snake venom, and on the pharmacology of traditional Chinese medicine.

In addition to participating in pharmacological and toxicological research, Tu also contributed to medical education. After the World War II, he was the first dean of National Taiwan University Medical College. In 1954, Tu founded Kaohsiung Medical College (now Kaohsiung Medical University) and became the first president of the College (1954–1966).

External links

Dr. Chong-Ming Du 杜聰明 博士
Dr. Tsungmng Tu Foundation 杜聰明博士獎學基金會

1893 births
1986 deaths
Hokkien scientists
Hokkien people
Scientists from New Taipei
Presidents of National Taiwan University
Academic staff of Kaohsiung Medical University
Kyoto University alumni
Taiwanese toxicologists
Taiwanese pharmacologists
Academic staff of the National Taiwan University
Taiwanese people of Hoklo descent